Maurice "Maus" Gatsonides (February 14, 1911 in Gombong, Kebumen Regency – November 29, 1998 in  Heemstede) was a Dutch rally driver and inventor. Gatsonides was born in Central Java in the former Dutch East Indies (now Indonesia). He founded the company "Gatsometer BV" in the Netherlands in 1958.

Today, Gatsonides' fame largely results from inventing the Gatso speed camera, a speed measuring device used today by many police forces to catch speeding drivers. He originally invented the Gatso speed camera to measure his cornering speed in an attempt to improve his driving.

Motor racing
Gatsonides is primarily known for inventing the speed camera, but his primary interest was in motor racing. Maurice was passionate about racing and raced in many events.

In 1949, he built his own car. It was nicknamed the "Platje" (English: "Flatty")  because of its aerodynamic shape. The car caused a sensation at the Dutch Zandvoort Racetrack, passing all of the opponents including MG's. Maurice was forced to sell the Flatty to pay creditors after trying to put his own V8 sportscar into production. The Flatty however, survived. It was found abandoned in the 1970s and has now been restored by Joop Bruggeman. It is the last-known surviving Gatso car.

Gatsonides won the Monte Carlo Rally in 1953 driving a Ford Zephyr.

References

External links
Company history at RitzSite
Gatso sportscars

1911 births
1998 deaths
Dutch rally drivers
Dutch racing drivers
24 Hours of Le Mans drivers
20th-century Dutch inventors
20th-century Dutch businesspeople
People from Kebumen Regency
World Sportscar Championship drivers